Kazanskoye is a rural locality (a selo) and the administrative center of Kazansky District, Tyumen Oblast, Russia. Population:

References

Notes

Sources

Rural localities in Tyumen Oblast